The Essential Stevie Ray Vaughan and Double Trouble is a compilation album of material by Stevie Ray Vaughan and Double Trouble released in 2002 (see 2002 in music).  The album was released by Epic Records and includes songs from 1980 to 1990 including several live tracks on two discs. In 2008, the album was re-released as part of the Limited Edition 3.0 series, with a third bonus disc containing six additional songs culled from studio albums.

Track listing
All songs previously released.

Disc One
"Shake for Me" (live) (Willie Dixon) – 3:51 (released on In the Beginning)
"Rude Mood/Hide Away" (live) (Vaughan, Freddie King, Sonny Thompson) – 4:58 (released on Live at Montreux 1982 & 1985)
"Love Struck Baby" (Vaughan) – 2:22 (released on Texas Flood)
"Pride and Joy" (Vaughan) – 3:40 (released on Texas Flood)
"Texas Flood" (Larry Davis, Joseph Wade Scott) – 5:21 (released on Texas Flood)
"Mary Had a Little Lamb" (Buddy Guy) – 2:47 (released on Texas Flood)
"Lenny" (Vaughan) – 4:57 (released on Texas Flood)
"Scuttle Buttin’" (Vaughan) – 1:51 (released on Couldn't Stand the Weather)
"Couldn't Stand the Weather" (Vaughan) – 4:41 (released on Couldn't Stand the Weather)
"The Things (That) I Used To Do" (Eddie Jones) – 4:54 (released on Couldn't Stand the Weather)
"Cold Shot" (Michael Kindred, W.C. Clark) – 4:01 (released on Couldn't Stand the Weather)
"Tin Pan Alley (aka Roughest Place in Town)" (Robert Geddins) – 9:12 (released on Couldn't Stand the Weather)
"Give Me Back My Wig" (T.R. Taylor) – 4:07 (released on Couldn't Stand the Weather)
"Empty Arms" (Vaughan) – 3:29 (released on The Sky Is Crying)
"The Sky Is Crying" (Live) (Elmore James, Morris Levy, Clarence Lewis) – 7:20 (released on SRV boxed set)
"Voodoo Child (Slight Return)" (Live) (Jimi Hendrix) – 11:53 (released on SRV boxed set)

Disc Two
"Say What!" (Vaughan) – 5:23 (released on Soul to Soul)
"Look at Little Sister" (Hank Ballard) – 3:08 (released on Soul to Soul)
"Change It" (Doyle Bramhall) – 3:57 (released on Soul to Soul)
"Come On (Part III)" (Earl King) – 4:30 (released on Soul to Soul)
"Life Without You" (Vaughan) – 4:18 (released on Soul to Soul)
"Little Wing" (Jimi Hendrix) – 6:48 (released on The Sky Is Crying)
"Willie the Wimp" (live) (Ruth Ellsworth-Carter, B. Carter) – 4:35 (released on Live Alive)
"Superstition" (live) (Stevie Wonder) – 4:41 (released on Live Alive)
"Leave My Girl Alone" (live) (Buddy Guy) – 4:47 (released on Epic promotional disc ESK 1998 and The Real Deal: Greatest Hits Volume 2)
"The House Is Rockin’" (Vaughan, Doyle Bramhall) – 2:24 (released on In Step)
"Crossfire" (Carter, Chris Layton, Ellsworth-Carter, Reese Wynans, Tommy Shannon) – 4:10 (released on In Step)
"Tightrope" (Vaughan, Doyle Bramhall) – 4:39 (released on In Step)
"Wall of Denial" (Vaughan, Doyle Bramhall) – 5:36 (released on In Step)
"Riviera Paradise" (Vaughan) – 8:50 (released on In Step)
"Telephone Song" (Vaughan, Doyle Bramhall) – 3:28 (released on Family Style)
"Long Way from Home" (Vaughan, Doyle Bramhall) – 3:15 (released on Family Style)
"Life by the Drop" (Doyle Bramhall, Barbara Logan) – 2:27 (released on The Sky Is Crying)

Disc Three ["Limited Edition 3.0" release only]
"Dirty Pool" (Vaughan) – 5:00 (released on Texas Flood)
"I'm Cryin" (Vaughan) – 3:43 (released on Texas Flood)
"Honey Bee" (Vaughan) – 2:42 (released on Couldn't Stand the Weather)
"Ain't Gone 'N' Give Up On Love" (Vaughan) – 6:07 (released on Soul to Soul)
"You'll Be Mine" (Dixon) – 3:45 (released on Soul to Soul)
"Scratch-N-Sniff" (Vaughan, Bramhall) – 2:42 (released on In Step)

Personnel
A complete list of personnel can be found on each previous release.

Production for compilation
Bob Irwin – producer
Vic Anesini – mastering
Steve Berkowitz – A&R
John Jackson – project director
Josh Cheuse – art direction and design
Stephanie Chernikowski – cover photography, liner photos
Alan Messer – liner photos
Don Hunstein – liner photos
David Gahr – photography
Robert Matheu – photography
James Minchin III – photography

Certifications

References

Stevie Ray Vaughan albums
2002 greatest hits albums